Shurab Khan (also Romanized as Shūrāb Khān and Shūrāb-e Khān; also known as Shūrāb) is a village in Qaslan Rural District, Serishabad District, Qorveh County, Kurdistan Province, Iran. At the 2006 census, its population was 317, in 77 families. The village is populated by Kurds.

References 

Towns and villages in Qorveh County
Kurdish settlements in Kurdistan Province